The Association of Theater and Concert Hall Directors (Dutch: Vereniging van Schouwburg- en Concertgebouwdirecties) in short VSCD is a Dutch association founded in 1955.

It presents many awards, including the theater awards Louis d'Or, Theo d'Or, Arlecchino, and Colombina.

References

1955 establishments in the Netherlands
Trade associations based in the Netherlands